The 1986 Campeonato Brasileiro Série B, the second level of the Campeonato Brasileiro Série A, was a parallel competition organized by the CBF. The competition had 36 clubs and the winners of each one of the four groups were promoted to the same season's Série A.

Standings

Group E

Group F

Group G

Group H

References

2
1986
B